Graffham Common is a   nature reserve between Midhurst and  Petworth in West Sussex. It is owned and managed by the Sussex Wildlife Trust.

This former pine plantation is being restored back to heath and grassland by the clearance of  pine trees and rhododendrons. Drainage ditches have been blocked to allow the natural restoration of wet heath. Wet seepages provide a habitat for cross-leaved heath, hare’s-tail cottongrass and purple moor-grass.

References

Sussex Wildlife Trust